FC Saturn Moscow Oblast was an association football club from Russia founded in 1991 and playing on professional level between 1993 and 2010. Since 2004 it was the farm club of FC Saturn Moscow Oblast. In early 2011, the parent club FC Saturn Moscow Oblast went bankrupt and dropped out of the Russian Premier League due to huge debts. However, Saturn-2 passed the licensing and participated in the Russian Second Division.

Historical team names and home cities
1991–1992: FC Kosmos Dolgoprudny
1993: FC Kosmos-Kvest Dolgoprudny
1994–1998: FC Kosmos Dolgoprudny
1999–2002: FC Kosmos Elektrostal
2002–2003: FC Kosmos Yegoryevsk
2004–2007: FC Saturn Yegoryevsk
2007–2011: FC Saturn-2 Moscow Oblast
2011–present: FC Saturn Moscow Oblast

Current squad
As of May 29, 2012, according to the RFS website .

External links
Official website

Association football clubs established in 1991

Defunct football clubs in Russia
Football in Moscow Oblast
1991 establishments in Russia